Red Ring may refer to:

 A ring with a red gemstone

Biology
 Red ring disease, caused by the nematode Bursaphelenchus cocophilus
 Bicyclus anisops, red ring bush brown, a butterfly
 Hestina assimilis, red ring skirt, a butterfly
 Phellinus pini, red ring rot, a fungus

Literature and comics
 Narya, the Red Ring, one of the Rings in J. R. R. Tolkien's Middle-earth universe
 Red power ring of the Red Lantern Corps in the DC universe

Video games
 A special type of collectible ring in a number of Sonic the Hedgehog games
 A red ring that appears in some Mario games
 Red Ring of Death, a common Xbox 360 problem

See also
 Ring of Red, 2000 video game
 Red Ring Rico, Phantasy Star Online character